Future Primitive is the debut album of Paul Haslinger, released on October 25, 1994, through Wildcat Recording Corporation.

Track listing

Personnel 
Charlie Campagna – guitar
Daniel Galliduani – spoken word on "La Nuit M'Appelle"
Paul Haslinger – instruments, production, mixing
Nona Hendryx – vocals
Iki Levy – percussion
Clair Marlo – vocals
Todd Washington – vocals
Mitch Zelezny – mixing

References

External links 
 

1994 debut albums
Paul Haslinger albums